The Oral Health Foundation (formerly known as the British Dental Health Foundation) was formed in 1971 and is one of the world’s leading independent oral health charities (registered charity number 263198). 
It is headquartered in the United Kingdom and aims to help the public improve their oral health and hygiene through a range of activities run under the name of the Oral Health Foundation. The current President of the Oral Health Foundation is Mhari Coxon, and the CEO is Dr Nigel Carter OBE.

Formation 

On 9 July 1970, thirty dentists with others of similar interests met at the Berners hotel in London to discuss the formation of a new dental health organisation with soon-to-be Chairman Jack Manning being elected to set up a formation committee. The meeting had been the brainchild of a number of enthusiasts from the British Dental Trade Association led by John Davis and Peter de Trey. The formation committee worked in close association with the British Dental Association (BDA) over the next ten months and to then create the British Dental Health Foundation and a meeting was held at the Royal Society of Medicine on Friday 21 May 1971.

Over the next eighteen months an enormous amount of activity was undertaken by the members of the formation committee to establish funding, formulate the Articles and Memorandum of Association and apply to the Charity commissioners for registration as a charity. The charity was to be unique amongst dental bodies in that membership would be open to not only the profession, but also ancillaries and corporate members from the dental trade.

On 26 October 1971, the first meeting of initial subscribers was held at the Royal Society of Medicine. Jack Manning was elected the first Chairman of Council, John Davis the honorary secretary and Martin Seymour the Treasurer.  Mr Douglas Lewis was to be appointed as the first consultant director. The Association for the Preservation of Dental Health Ltd, trading as the British Dental Health Foundation (later to become the Oral Health Foundation) was born. Its main aim had been defined as 'To preserve the dental health of the community in all its aspects and in particular to educate the community in the benefits of achieving and maintaining the highest standards of dental health'.

At the time, this type of public activity, which would rely on funding from the dental trade as well as the profession and involve the whole dental team, was not considered by the BDA to be appropriate to its role as the dentist's professional association, trade union and negotiating body. Indeed, it was not until some eighteen years later, after one or two previous abortive forays into the world of public relations that the BDA set up its press office with ex-Oral Health Foundation Executive Director Lynn Stroud at the helm.

Campaigns 

The Oral Health Foundation has several awareness campaigns that act as extensions of their work in providing oral health information to the public.

National Smile Month 
National Smile Month has been running since 1976 and is one of the largest dental health education events held around the world.

The main aims of National Smile Month are to tackle inequalities, improving children’s oral health, and providing support to the general public. They also have worked with large corporate supporters in recent years on various National Smile Month activities including their oral health podcast  and other digital media.

National Smile Month 2022 focused on inequalities with the theme Everyone Deserves a Healthy Smile.

Mouth Cancer Action Month 
Mouth Cancer Action Month is a public awareness campaign and it has been running for over 20 years. It aims to raise awareness of the effects and causes of mouth cancer through activities such as interviews with mouth cancer survivors, ribbon appeals, events such as blue Wednesday and informing people how to perform mouth cancer checks at home.

The most recent Mouth Cancer Action Month also ran a launch event at the House of Commons where MPs signed a charter and met with leading dental professionals to learn about how parliament and government legislation can help those with mouth cancer.

The Truth About Tooth Decay 
The Truth About Tooth Decay is an online hub for the most essential and trusted advice about tooth decay. We want to help you spot the early signs of the disease and most importantly, give you the information on how to prevent it.

This campaign is supported by Colgate-Palmolive.

Safe Smiles 
In 2021, two of the foundation’s previous campaigns Safe Brace and The Tooth Whitening Information Group were merged to form Safe Smiles. 

The aim of this campaign is to raise awareness of illegal tooth whitening procedures, the dangers of direct-to-consumer orthodontics and the risk of dental tourism. This campaign is also supported by the British Orthodontic Society, British Association of Dental Nurses, Society of British Dental Nurses, British Dental Bleaching Society, British Academy of Cosmetic Dentistry, British Dental Industry Association and British Association of Dental Therapists. It is sponsored in part by Align Technology.

HPV Vaccination Catch-Up 
The Oral Health Foundation are active campaigners for gender-neutral HPV vaccination, members of HPV Action (now dissolved) and are on the expert advisory committee for Jabs for the Boys. The Jabs for the Boys campaign aims to raise awareness of the virus and support calls for an HPV vaccination catch-up programme for British males.

Dental Buddy 
Dental Buddy is a programme which is run by the Oral Health Foundation that provides educational resources for Early Years' Education, Key Stage One and Key Stage Two. Resources include things such as activity sheets, lesson plans and interactive presentations for teachers to show their students. All of these activities are designed to help get young children thinking about their oral health and begin making informed choices.

Dental Buddy is used in primary schools and nurseries all over the UK, and all available resources can be downloaded by filling out a request form on their website.

Accreditation 

The accreditation process was brought in to help consumers make informed choices when it came to oral health products, and to let people easily know that the claims these products advertisements were boasting have been rigorously checked and vetted by a panel of independent experts.

Many approaches had been made to the Oral Health Foundation over the years by companies wishing to accredit oral hygiene products. One of these included a talk at their 1975 AGM by Dr William Brown from Iowa on - 'Endorsement of Dental Products - Yes or No?'.

It was eventually launched in 1991 and within the first eight months of the scheme being introduced 37 products were accredited and steady growth in the succeeding years have led to over 1,500 product submissions and 150 products currently on shelf with accreditation.

The Oral Health Foundation still evaluates consumer oral health care products over thirty years on to ensure that the claims made by manufacturers are clinically proven and not exaggerated. This is to give all members of the public some reassurance that the products they are using can do what they claim to.

Their independent panel of internationally recognised dental experts study all the product claims carefully to make sure they are true, and backed up by reliable scientific evidence.

For more than 20 years, they have helped the dental profession and consumers make informed choices about which oral care products they buy. Accreditation gives them the opportunity to provide people with information, protection, and education - delivered via recognition of the charity's ‘Approved' Smiley-face logo (pictured right).

Currently there are more than 150 accredited products on sale in 60 countries around the world, look out for the oral health approved logo on your products to know that they are independently verified. Currently accredited brands include a variety of Oral B products, Listerine, Wrigley's Extra, Polo mints, Bambooth toothbrushes, Babycup  and much more.

Dental Helpline 

The free and independent Dental Helpline has taken more than 350,000 calls since it was launched on 2 June 1997.

The Dental Helpline is based at the Oral Health Foundation's head office in Warwickshire and is staffed by fully trained oral health experts and dental nurses. Advisors will provide free and impartial advice on a range of  oral health topics, such as dental terms and treatment procedures, oral hygiene, current legislation and regulations, dental charges, complaints procedures, and referrals to other organisations.

Since the launch on 2 June 1997, The Dental Helpline has taken more than 400,000 calls from members of the public who are concerned about their oral health.

The Dental Helpline continues to be an invaluable resource for those looking to seek advice, help and reassurance about their oral health and wellbeing. It is a truly charitable service. All enquiries are completely confidential and answered quickly.

Members of the public can contact the dental helpline via their dedicated Facebook page, via telephone and a live chat feature launching soon on their website. Opening times are between 09:00 and 17:00, Monday to Friday.

Whilst advice is free, calls to the helpline are charged at a local rate.

Website 

The Oral Health Foundation's website attracts in excess of three million visitors every year.

On 14 February 2011 the Oral Health Foundation moved from the .org.uk domain and launched their new website at www.dentalhealth.org. The site includes new features such as a dental blog written by Chief Executive Dr Nigel Carter and a number of other guest bloggers, a regularly updated dental and oral health news section and a dentistry-based forum gaining the attention to both public and profession.

The most popular feature of the dental health website is the "A-Z Oral Health Information" section. Presented in a user-friendly Question and Answers (Q&A) format, the section contains oral health information and advice about more than 50 different topics.

References

External links 
 Oral Health Foundation Official site
 Oral Health Foundation Official twitter page
 Oral Health Foundation Official Facebook page
 Oral Health Foundation Official Linkedin page
 The Oral Health Podcast
 

Dental organisations based in the United Kingdom
Health charities in the United Kingdom
Health in Warwickshire
1971 establishments in the United Kingdom
Organisations based in Warwickshire
Organizations established in 1971
Rugby, Warwickshire